Natalie Kalibat is an American sportscaster, journalist and television personality who is currently doing live sports broadcasts as a play-by-play announcer, color analyst, and reporter for ESPN and other sports networks.

Early life
Kalibat grew up in Princeton, New Jersey.

Kalibat won the 2012 United States Olympic Trials for diving in the Synchronized Women 10m Platform event and won 1-meter, 3-meter and platform AAU titles in 2012. She qualified for Olympic trials while a senior in high school.

Diving and college
She was a diver at the University of Southern California and was part of the 2016 Pac-12 championship team, the first in program history. She graduated from the Annenberg School for Communication and Journalism.

While at USC, Kalibat interned for ESPN, Pac-12 Networks and KNBC.

Career

She was hired as the weekend sports anchor at WBOY-TV in Clarksburg, West Virginia in July 2016 before moving to WRIC-TV in December 2017. Kalibat covered the Washington Football Team during their training camp in Richmond. She also covered the NASCAR Cup Series at Richmond Raceway.

She has worked as a diving analyst for Big Ten Network at the 2018 championships and as a swimming and diving analyst for ACC Network Extra starting in 2019  and Big 12 Now covering the Big 12 diving championships in 2020, 2021, 2022 and 2023. She was the play-by-play broadcaster for the 2022 Northeast Conference women's lacrosse championships.  Kalibat served as the sideline reporter for the 2022 Ivy League women's lacrosse championships and the 2022 NCAA women's lacrosse tournament games held at Princeton. She also currently calls swimming and diving for the Ivy League on ESPN  and FloSwimming  and swimming & diving and women's lacrosse for the Atlantic 10 on ESPN.   She broadcast women's basketball, softball and women's lacrosse for the Big South on ESPN  and is a hockey analyst for the Ivy League on ESPN, a basketball sideline reporter for Conference USA on ESPN+  and NXT Level Sports  and a lacrosse and softball analyst for the American Athletic Conference on ESPN+.

Family
Her mother Rebecca, sister Kristiana  and brother Peter  were all college swimmers, with Rebecca competing at University of Mary Washington, Kristiana at Wagner College and Peter at Georgetown University. Natalie got engaged to then-VCU assistant baseball coach Rich Witten in 2019. The two were married at Saint Paul's Catholic Church in Princeton on December 18, 2021. The reception was held at Jasna Polana.

Rich Witten is now the head baseball coach at Florida International University.

References 

University of Southern California alumni
American sports announcers
Sportspeople from Mercer County, New Jersey
American female divers